"The Nameless One" is the protagonist of Black Isle Studios 1999 role-playing video game, Planescape: Torment. In the game, he suffers from a curse of immortality that has spanned thousands of years. Every time he dies, another person in the multiverse dies to fuel his resurrection. Upon rebirth, The Nameless One has little to no recollection of his past life, and often with completely different personality than before.

Planescape: Torment begins in medias res, with the character awakening from a previous death on a mortuary slab in Sigil. He sets out on a quest to regain his lost memories and discover why he is immortal. In the process, he slowly learns about the varying personalities of his previous incarnations, and the influence they have had on the planes and the people that surround him. The character has an expansive backstory through a multitude of incarnations, both benevolent and evil. The character was voiced by Michael T. Weiss and created by Chris Avellone. The character received universally positive reviews.

Planescape: Torment

Origins
The Nameless One's origins have been lost through time and as a result his history is shrouded in mystery. The Nameless One was once human. He sought the advice of a man named Morte, who ended up tricking him into committing the most terrible crime imaginable. The nature of the crime itself is unknown, save that the planes are still slowly dying because of it.  At the same time, because of this The Nameless One was doomed to an eternal servitude in the Blood War.

In order to escape his punishment of being damned to an eternity in the Blood Wars, and perhaps to atone for his crime, he sought the help of someone powerful enough to make him immortal, so that he could spend the rest of his life doing nothing but good. Morte, also trying to atone for his actions, directed him to the Gray Waste, where he would find the night hag, Ravel Puzzlewell. The Nameless One traveled to the Gray Waste, to find the "Greatest of the Gray Sisters". Ravel told him that he must pay for her services, and the Nameless One presented her with the challenge of answering the question: "What can change the nature of a man?". He manipulated her with the challenge of making him immortal and seduced her to bend her to his will. Ravel agreed and performed the ritual out of love, succeeding in making the Nameless One immortal. However, the ritual was flawed, for every time he died, he forgot his memories and became another person. In order to perform the magic, Ravel split the Nameless One's essence in two, and stripped his mortality from him, which turned into "The Transcendent One". The Nameless One's immortality came at the terrible price of suffering the torment of not bearing his mortality with him and he will pull tormented souls towards him because of it. In order to test that her spell had worked, Ravel stabbed the Nameless One to death and when he awoke, without his memories, she realised that she had not entirely succeeded in her spell.

From this point onward, the Nameless One's many incarnations travelled the planes, trying to gather together information on who he was from the fragmented memory of past existences.

The Second Incarnation
The story of what happens after the Nameless One's mortality is stripped from him is told by Morte while exchanging tales with Yves the Tale-Chaser. The Nameless One awakes from his "death", without his memories, and is offered three wishes by Ravel Puzzlewell. Not knowing himself, the Nameless One asks "to know who he is". Ravel grants him his wish, but the truth of his crimes to the planes causes him so much pain that he asks Ravel immediately to make his second wish that he forget everything.

He awakes a second time, to find Ravel standing over him. She asks him what his third wish will be. He replies "to know who he is" again. Ravel grants him the wish, then leaves, telling him "That was your first wish." Presumably, the incarnation spent the rest of his life haunted by his crimes until he died and forgot everything.

The Practical Incarnation
The "Practical Incarnation" was the incarnation that came closest to defeating the Transcendent One. He was cold, ruthless, and incredibly intelligent. He was always tense, suspicious, and watchful of enemies. He was incredibly ruthless and a force to be reckoned with, and Xachariah notes that "there was no denying that anybody who messed with you [The Practical Incarnation] ended up in the black chapters of the dead book."

He kept very detailed notes in his journal and was the one to issue the tattouage of the instructions onto his own back so that future incarnations could more easily find out who they were. He was the one to trick Pharod into searching for the Bronze Sphere for himself, and imprisoned Vhailor in a cell, so that, in years to come, he could release Vhailor and exploit his abilities. He commissioned a dream machine from Xeno Xander and a portal to reach Ravel from the Godsmen, but was never able to make use of them. He attempted to thwart his hidden enemy, of whom he was forever suspicious. He tried creating false bodies, hiding on the Outer Planes, and building a tomb to trap him in, which he admits to have been disastrous.

In order to access the Fortress of Regrets, the Practical Incarnation enlisted help from companions, using trickery and emotional manipulation to get them to follow him. He pried Morte from the Pillar of Skulls and forced him to do his will, tricked Deionarra into loving him, enslaved Dak'kon after saving him from certain death, and enlisted the help of Xachariah, and forced him to sign a Death Contract with the Dustmen. No matter how cruel, none of the Practical Incarnation's companions ever entertained the thought of abandoning him. Xachariah was a blind archer, who could see by other means, and whose arrows always found his enemies' hearts. Once the Practical Incarnation had recruited Xachariah, he got him drunk and forced him to sign a Death Contract with the Dustmen, which would mean that when he eventually died, he would be condemned to a lifetime of servitude as a zombie. Xachariah traveled with the Nameless One to the Fortress of Regrets, and was mortally wounded there. He took to drinking and died of his wounds soon after and, because of his contract, was assigned to Mortuary work as a zombie.

The Paranoid Incarnation

The "Paranoid Incarnation" was an overly cautious and extremely insane incarnation of The Nameless One. He was the incarnation that set up the traps within the Dodecahedron Journal. He was the incarnation that the Lady of Pain placed in her maze as punishment for killing people. He was also the incarnation who learned the language of Uyo and, after mastering it, killed off the linguist, Fin, to prevent people from being able to decode his journal writings. The Paranoid Incarnation also destroyed the meticulously kept journal that the Practical Incarnation kept to help his future incarnations. He also tried to remove the tattoos from his body because they were a form of a journal. He did not destroy the journal kept in the Nameless One's tomb but made many improvements to the traps within the tomb. He also discovered a way of getting into Ravel's maze using a portable portal generator, but never succeeded in doing so.

In the novel
In the official novelization of the game, which is only loosely based on its plot, The Nameless One was a human being, who made a pact with the Baatezu Fhjull Forked-Tongue (an NPC encountered late in the game), offering his service as a soldier in the Blood War in exchange for his town being spared. He then sought a way to become immortal to avoid the Blood War entirely, and all of his most recent struggles are, in fact, the culmination of the machinations of Fhjull to claim The Nameless One's soul. In the book, The Nameless One's ability to recall memories from prior incarnations (beginning with the one that wakes up in the Mortuary) is due to being dosed prior to awakening in the Mortuary with a special elixir derived from the waters of the River Styx by Fhjull Forked-Tongue.

Reception
The Nameless One has received overwhelmingly positive reviews, being praised as an unorthodox role-playing game character and a unique and diverse protagonist. Eurogamer gave him the Gaming Globes 2000 award in the category Male Lead Character.

GameSpot's Greg Kasavin said that "the Nameless One" was nothing like the conventional main character of an RPG: "Even Torments protagonist, who is heavily scarred, entirely tattooed, and dressed in bones and animal hides, seems nothing like the usual role-playing game hero." Kasavin noted the diversity of the Nameless One's choices in dialogue that "often lets you choose to make promises, bluff, or play dumb; the game lets you perceive small details if your character is intelligent, understand philosophical implications if he's wise, and intimidate or charm if he's strong or charismatic. Your character's moral alignment and his affiliation with Sigil's different factions are openly flexible and have a noticeable impact on the course of the game." He also deemed the character's "perverse incapacity to permanently die" as helping to maintain pacing, and noted the possible changes of classes the character can go through, "your character can readily switch between fighter, thief, and magic-user classes and can rapidly advance to a high level of proficiency in any and all of these, which is justified within the game as not so much an acquiring of new skills as a remembrance of latent centuries-old talents."

Empire placed the character as fourth on a list of the greatest video game characters, stating that "if you're looking for one of the most original, inspired and fascinating characters since gaming began, then look no further than The Nameless One" and "rather than other RPGs of the era, which gave you a blank slate character to flesh out as you wanted, Torments strength was in the detail and richness of its protagonist, who remains one of the very best more than ten years on." In 2012, GamesRadar ranked him as the 45th "most memorable, influential, and badass" protagonist in games, commenting: "Recovering the fragments of The Nameless One’s past through his various incarnations is an emotional journey that reveals him to be a character that has truly suffered many lifetimes’ worth of anguish. Though you can imprint your own philosophical views on him through the game's long-winded dialog, he's still a fully realized and impressively developed character all his own."

RPGFan said that "as a character, The Nameless One exceeds every video game protagonist to date." Another review from RPGFan noted the diversity of the game: "Want to play the noble, yet tortured hero? The sarcastic and reluctant adventurer? The selfish scumbag? You can do all of those." In 2011, UGO.com ranked him at number two on the list of their favorite immortal characters in entertainment, adding "sometimes, living forever just ain't worth the hassle."

References

Dungeons & Dragons characters
Fantasy video game characters
Fictional characters with death or rebirth abilities
Fictional characters with immortality
Fictional characters without a name
Fictional suicides
Male characters in video games
Planescape
Role-playing video game characters
Video game characters introduced in 1999
Video game characters who use magic
Video game characters with slowed ageing
Video game protagonists
Zombie and revenant characters in video games